Lifetime Products Inc. is a privately owned company founded in 1986. Its main products are blow-molded polyethylene folding chairs and tables, picnic tables, home basketball equipment, sheds, coolers, kayaks and paddleboards, and lawn and garden items, along with OEM steel and plastic items from other companies.

Overview

Lifetime Products uses polyethylene blow molding and metal forming technology to create a variety of consumer and industrial products. Lifetime has a large single-point blow molding plastics facility in Clearfield, Utah, occupying , and employs over 2,200 people worldwide. The company produces the only folding chair to comply with the Business and Institutional Furniture Manufacturer's Association (BIFMA), which defines durability standards testing of commercial-grade chairs. Lifetime is headquartered in the Freeport Center in Clearfield, Utah, and has vertically integrated manufacturing facilities in Clearfield, Xiamen, China, and Mascot, Tennessee. US distribution facilities are located in North Kansas City, Missouri, and Columbus, Ohio. International distribution facilities are in Monterrey, Mexico and Lille, France.

History
In 1972, Lifetime Product's founder, Barry Mower, made a sturdier basketball pole for his backyard using pipe, plywood, and a basketball rim. Seeing the potential in what he had constructed, he placed an ad in the local classifieds and made his first sale.

His business eventually became a sporting goods store, and in March 1986, became Lifetime Products, a name inspired by the goal of building durable and lasting products. Shortly after, the research and design staff created and patented the "Quick Adjust" basketball system, which allowed users to adjust residential basketball rims from 7.5 to 10 feet.

In its first three years, the company grew to 167 employees and occupied  of manufacturing, office, and warehouse space. New equipment, including an electrostatic powder coating operation and a robotic rim welding system, was installed to keep up with demand. A metal fabrication department was also formed to constantly update and improve presses and dies.

Utilizing its expertise in plastics and metals, Lifetime then developed a blow-molded folding picnic table in 1995, a folding banquet table in 1998, and a steel-reinforced blow-molded shed in 2005.

In May 2010, Lifetime acquired the assets of Dragonfly Innovation Corp., a producer of blow-molded kayaks, and kayak production was moved to Lifetime's facilities in Utah. In November 2011, Lifetime acquired Pennsylvania-based Emotion Kayaks, making Lifetime one of the largest kayak manufacturers in the world.

In August 2017, the company expanded US operations by opening a 700,000+ square foot east coast manufacturing and distribution facility in Mascot, TN just east of Knoxville, TN.This new facility will produce Lifetime’s line of water sports products including kayaks and paddleboards, as well as their outdoor Play System line of products. With this new location for manufacturing and distribution, Lifetime will be able to meet its customers’ increasing demand for products with shortened supply chains and faster shipping times.

Products

Tables and chairs
Folding Chair
Stacking Chair
Folding tables
Round tables
Personal tables
Picnic tables
Camp and sport tables

Basketball systems
Portable Residential Basketball Systems
In-ground Residential Basketball Systems
Bolt-down Residential Basketball Systems
Adjustable-Height Basketball Systems (portable, in-ground, and bolt-down)
Rim and Backboard Stationary Combinations

Sheds
Storage buildings
Storage sheds
Garden sheds
Extension kits and accessories

Lawn and garden
Yard cart
Wheelbarrow
Compost tumbler
Glider bench
Deck box

Playground equipment
Outdoor playsets
Teeter-totters
Dome climbers
Swing sets
Tetherball set

Kayaks
Sit-on-top Kayaks
Sit-Inside Kayaks
Youth Kayaks
Paddleboards

Coolers
5 gallon water cooler
28 quart cooler
48 quart cooler
55 quart cooler
65 quart cooler
77 quart cooler
115 quart cooler

Lifetime Metals
Lifetime Metals produces processed steel items for both Lifetime Products, and for other manufacturers in the region. Services provided include coil slitting and leveling, shearing, stamping with Minster machine presses, tube mill operations, roll forming, and other processes.

Lifetime Store
Lifetime owns and operates the retail chain Lifetime Store, formerly called Backyards Inc., which is a factory outlet for Lifetime Products carrying both new and seconds, or blemished products. There are seven store locations in Utah and Idaho.

Patents and innovations
1986 - Introduced and patented the first adjustable basketball pole on the market
1992 - Introduced its line of portable basketball systems
1992 - Invented and patented the friction weld joint for basketball poles
1993 - Invented a blow-molded base that is airtight and watertight
1995 - Invented blow-molded polyethylene tabletops
1995 - Invented a fully assembled, folding picnic table
1996 - Invented the Power Lift, the first one-hand, pneumatic height adjustment mechanism
1998 - Introduced blow-molded polyethylene folding banquet tables
2000 - Introduced the only folding chair to meet or exceed BIFMA standards
2001 - Introduced Mammoth Basketball Equipment, a line of professional-quality home basketball systems
2004 - Introduced the Shatter Proof Backboard, the first virtually unbreakable backboard made with Makrolon polycarbonate
2005 - Introduced its multi-branded line of outdoor storage sheds
2006 - Introduced an innovative new line of steel utility trailers
2007 - Introduced its line of residential playground equipment
2008 - Introduced a line of residential garden products
2010 - Invented a low cost tent trailer that carries an all-terrain vehicle
2010 - Acquired Dragonfly Innovations, expanding its offerings to include kayaks
2011 - Acquired Emotion Kayaks, making Lifetime one of the largest kayak manufacturers in the world
2015 - Acquired LightHeaded Beds, LLC.
2018 - Introduced a line of coolers

References

External links
Official website: Lifetime.com

Manufacturing companies established in 1986
Companies based in Clearfield, Utah
Manufacturing companies based in Utah
Privately held companies based in Utah
1986 establishments in Utah